The Sacrifice of Isaac refers to the Binding of Isaac, a story from the Hebrew Bible found in Genesis 22.

The Sacrifice of Isaac may also refer to:
 Sacrifice of Isaac (Andrea del Sarto), three c. 1527–1530 paintings by Andrea del Sarto
 Abraham and Isaac (Titian), a c. 1543–1544 painting by Titian, also called the Sacrifice of Isaac
 Sacrifice of Isaac (Caravaggio), two c. 1598–1603 paintings by Caravaggio
 The Sacrifice of Isaac (Rembrandt), a 1635 painting by Rembrandt
 Abraham's Sacrifice of Isaac, a 1715 painting by Federico Bencovich

See also 
 Abraham and Isaac (disambiguation)